Cladogramma is an extinct genus of prehistoric marine diatoms with uncertain affinity. Species are known from the Pliocene of Japan, Miocene of the United States (North Carolina), Cretaceous and Paleocene of Antarctica.

References

External links 
 

 
 Cladogramma at fossilworks
 Cladogramma at WoRMS

†
Enigmatic bikont taxa
Prehistoric eukaryote genera